This is a list of fictional rabbits and hares (Leporidae). Fantasy hybrids such as jackalopes are not listed.

Literature

Comics

Video media

Film

Television

Animation

Video games

Advertising mascots
The Cadbury's Caramel Bunny
Dr. Rabbit, a dentist character created by Colgate
Duracell Bunny
Energizer Bunny
Glenda, the Plan 9 Bunny
Gus Honeybun
Hip Hop
Nesquik bunny
Noid
The Playboy Bunny
The Trix rabbit
Jive Bunny, the face of the UK chart-topping novelty pop music act Jive Bunny and the Mastermixers
The GameStop Bunny mascot
Carl, the Blockbuster rabbit
The Bunny-Luv Mascot

Fantasy

Mythology and folklore
Cabbit
The Easter Bunny
Hare of Inaba
Hare in one of Aesop's Fables, The Hare and the Tortoise
The Moon Rabbit, India, China, Japan.
Nanabhozo or Mahnabohzo, rabbit god of many Amerindian tribes
The rabbit taken to the moon by Quetzalcoatl, Aztec deity
Rabbits, of Chinese zodiac year

Fictional hybrid species
Cabbit
Jackalope
Skvader
Wererabbit
Wolpertinger

Others 
Lulla, a stuffed bowtie blue from Suzy's Zoo

See also
List of fictional animals
Moon gazing hare
Moon rabbit
Rabbits in the arts
Rabbits in culture and literature
Three hares

References 

Rabbits